The Saganing River, also known as Saganing Creek, is a  stream in the U.S. state of Michigan.

Its main tributary, Saganing Drain, rises in western Gibson Township south of Bentley and flows to the east-southeast.

References 

Rivers of Michigan
Rivers of Arenac County, Michigan
Rivers of Bay County, Michigan
Tributaries of Lake Huron
Saginaw Bay